In topology and related areas of mathematics, a subnet is a generalization of the concept of subsequence to the case of nets. The analogue of "subsequence" for nets is the notion of a "subnet".  The definition is not completely straightforward, but is designed to allow as many theorems about subsequences to generalize to nets as possible.  

There are three non-equivalent definitions of "subnet". 
The first definition of a subnet was introduced by John L. Kelley in 1955 and later, Stephen Willard introduced his own (non-equivalent) variant of Kelley's definition in 1970. 
Subnets in the sense of Willard and subnets in the sense of Kelley are the most commonly used definitions of "subnet" but they are each  equivalent to the concept of "subordinate filter", which is the analog of "subsequence" for filters (they are not equivalent in the sense that there exist subordinate filters on  whose filter/subordinate–filter relationship cannot be described in terms of the corresponding net/subnet relationship). 
A third definition of "subnet" (not equivalent to those given by Kelley or Willard) that  equivalent to the concept of "subordinate filter" was introduced independently by Smiley (1957), Aarnes and Andenaes (1972), Murdeshwar (1983), and possibly others, although it is not often used. 

This article discusses the definition due to Stephen Willard (the other definitions are described in the article Filters in topology#Subnets).

Definitions

There are several different non-equivalent definitions of "subnet" and this article will use the definition introduced in 1970 by Stephen Willard, which is as follows: 

such that 
 
The set  being  in  means that for every  there exists some  such that  that is, for every  there exists an  such that 

Subnets versus subsequences

Importantly, a subnet is not merely the restriction of a net  to a directed subset of its domain  
The sequence  can be canonically identified with the function  defined by  Thus a sequence  is a subsequence of  if and only if there exists a strictly increasing function  such that 

Subsequences are subnets

Sequence and subnet but not a subsequence

While a sequence is a net, a sequence has subnets that are not subsequences. The key difference is that subnets can use the same point in the net multiple times and the indexing set of the subnet can have much larger cardinality. Using the more general definition where we do not require monotonicity, a sequence is a subnet of a given sequence, if and only if it can be obtained from some subsequence by repeating its terms and reordering them.

Subnet of a sequence that is not a sequence

A subnet of a sequence is  necessarily a sequence. 
For an example, let  be directed by the usual order  and define  by letting  be the ceiling of  Then  is an order-preserving map (because it is a non-decreasing function) whose image  is a cofinal subset of its codomain. Let  be any sequence (such as a constant sequence, for instance) and let  for every  (in other words, let ). This net  is not a sequence since its domain  is an uncountable set. However,  is a subnet of the sequence  since (by definition)  holds for every  Thus  is a subnet of  that is not a sequence.

Subnets induced by subsets

In this way, every infinite subset of  induces a canonical subnet that may be written as a subsequence. However, as demonstrated below, not every subnet of a sequence is a subsequence.

Applications

The definition generalizes some key theorems about subsequences:

 A net  converges to  if and only if every subnet of  converges to 
 A net  has a cluster point  if and only if it has a subnet  that converges to 
 A topological space  is compact if and only if every net in  has a convergent subnet (see net for a proof).

Clustering and closure

If  is a net in a subset  and if  is a cluster point of  then  In other words, every cluster point of a net in a subset belongs to the closure of that set. 

where  for each

Convergence versus clustering

If a net converges to a point  then  is necessarily a cluster point of that net. The converse is not guaranteed in general.
However, if  clusters at  then there exists a subnet of  that converges to  

into a directed set by declaring that 
 

Thus, a point  is a cluster point of a given net if and only if it has a subnet that converges to

See also

Notes

Citations

References

 
 
 
  
  

Topology